Paço de Lanheses is a manor house, with a private chapel, in Viana do Castelo, Minho Province, Norte Region, Portugal.

The house construction began in the 16th century but was totally refurbished in the 18th century and now was reformed to adapt to rural tourism with the service of bed and breakfasts.

The property belonged to the family Vaz de Almada, descendant and representative of the famous knight Álvaro Vaz de Almada (c. 1390 – 1449), recipient of the Order of the Garter and the English noble title the earl of Avranches. Later also have the Portuguese noble title earl of Almada.

References 
Paço de Lanheses

Manor houses in Portugal
Buildings and structures in Viana do Castelo
Bed and breakfasts